Hyderabad Junction railway station is located in the city of Hyderabad, Sindh, Pakistan and serves as a major railway junction.

History
Hyderabad Junction railway station was established in 1861 as part of Karachi-Kotri railway line. The construction on the work started when a memorandum of understanding (MoU) was signed between the Scinde Railway and East India Company in 1855.

In April 1858, Sir Henry Bartle Frere inaugrated the civil work in an official ceremony.

Railway chief engineers
 Mr. Wells
 Mr. Brunton

Services
The following trains stop at Hyderabad Junction station:

Gallery

See also
 List of railway stations in Pakistan
 Pakistan Railways

References

Railway stations in Hyderabad District, Pakistan
Railway stations on Hyderabad–Badin Branch Line
Railway stations on Karachi–Peshawar Line (ML 1)
1861 establishments in British India